Beržėnai Manor is a former residential manor in Beržėnai village, Kelmė district.

It was built in 1840 by Adolf Czapski and modified in 1885–1887. The palace in Neo-Gothic style consists of some parts with one or two floors, connected to a four-floor tower where the main entrance is situated.

References

Manor houses in Lithuania
Gothic Revival architecture in Lithuania